Richard Francisco Caceres Benitez (born on September 3, 1982 in Asuncion) is a Paraguayan footballer that previously played for Persiba Balikpapan in the Indonesia Super League.

References

External links

1982 births
Association football midfielders
Paraguayan expatriate footballers
Paraguayan expatriate sportspeople in Indonesia
Paraguayan footballers
Expatriate footballers in Indonesia
Liga 1 (Indonesia) players
Living people
Sportspeople from Asunción
Persija Jakarta players
Persiba Balikpapan players